Sindh Literature Festival is an annual international literary festival organized by Sindh Literary Foundation. It is one of the largest and fastest growing literary festival in Pakistan. SLF celebrates the power of words, culture, music, and the teachings of peace and tolerance. The purpose is to highlight that Sindh boasts rich and vibrant cultures and traditions and gives a different flavor to the province. It aims to provide a venue for established and emerging writers to meet with their readers and engage with fans. Literary and cultural traditions of the province are being celebrated at the three-day event.

Along with live coverage, a variety of stories, reports, programs, and packages are also produced. A number of TV channels and newspapers publish news and columns. Different sessions including book launches and discussions on various topics, theater, music, and mushaira are also planned over the course of three days.

Mission 
Sindh Literature Festival strive to promote and preserve the diverse languages, cultural assets, heritage, history, fine arts, music, education, archaeology, and anthropology of the region. Through book launches, discussions, theater, music, and mushaira sessions, SLF committed to encouraging and providing substantive space to female and young writers in our events, thus fostering a more inclusive literary community in Sindh.

Aims and Objectives 
 To provide writers a platform to interact with each other and the general public, especially their readers and youth.
 To give an opportunity to writers of all kind, established, new and emerging to present and produce their writings and thoughts.
 To promote languages, cultural assets, heritage, history, fine arts, music, education, archaeology and anthropology etc.
 To introduce newly published books and works in different languages.
 To highlight the importance of books and literature in the contemporary age of new technologies.
 To encourage female and young writers and give them substantive space in events of the festival.

Organisers 
Naseer Gopang and Zohaib Kaka are both journalists who are in charge of the festival. SLF was founded by Naseer Gopang and Zohaib Kaka is the festival advisor and managing director.

History, timeline

2016
The festival was first held in November 2016 at Beach Luxury Hotel Karachi. A number of prominent public figures have participated in the event including Sufi singers Abida Parveen, Saif Samejo, Amb Jogi, journalists Hamid Mir, Wusatullah Khan, politicians Raza Rabbani, Ayaz Latif Palijo, Sassui Palijo, Aitzaz Ahsan, actresses Sanam Baloch, Sabreen Hisbani and others.

2017
The second event was held in 2017 from 27–29 October at Beach Luxury Hotel Karachi. The event comprises a number of sessions that aim at highlighting the social issues of Sindh, Sindhi Culture, issues related with Sindhi language, developments in Sindhi literature. Book stalls, handicraft stalls, mushaira sessions, and musical sessions of folk singers are also arranged during the event.

2019
For the third time festival was jointly organised by the Sindh Literary Foundation, information department of the Sindh government and the Endowment Fund Trust from 22–24 February 2019 at Beach Luxury Hotel Karachi as in previous events. This time festival had many sessions on culture, language, politics, sufism and literature. Karachi's past was one of the main discussions of event.

2021
Annual gathering scheduled in March 2020 was canceled due to the COVID-19 pandemic, then it was scheduled from 12 to 14 March 2021 in Arts Council of Pakistan Karachi.

2022
Fifth SLF held from 18-20 March 2022, under the theme Centennial Celebration of Mohen-jo-Daro in Arts Council of Pakistan Karachi. The 5th Sindh Literature Festival (SLF) was organized from 18th to 20th March, 2022, at the Arts Council of Pakistan, Karachi. This event was attributed to the “Mohenjo-Daro” of Sindh as the Centennial Celebration of the discovery of Mohenjo-Daro, an ancient archaeological site of immense historical significance in the world.  For the occasion, a special theme song Mohenjo-Daro was prepared to sing the glory of this prehistoric city of Indus Civilization, written by renowned Sindhi poet Ali Akash, and composed by musician Saad Alavi. The opening ceremony of SLF started with this song, received well and cheered by the audience.

The main stage of the 5th Sindh Literature Festival was also designed to represent the importance of Mohenjo-Daro. In the 5th SLF, 28 sessions were conducted on various themes including a special session regarding the splendor “Mohenjo-Daro”, in which archaeologists from Pakistan and abroad participated; ten books were launched; and a “multilingual” Mushaira, a poetic sitting participated by poets of different languages of all provinces of Pakistan, was also part of the event. Besides that, two musical nights added the aroma of the festivity to the program. The festival was attended by a large number of people of all ages especially families and youth. The event was covered remarkably by print, electronic and social media. On the 1st day, an international session was held.

2023
Naseer Gopang and Zohaib Kaka, the Managing Director of SLF, announced the saving dates for the 6th Sindh Literature Festival on social media. It is scheduled to take place on March 3, 4, and 5, 2023. 6th SLF is focusing on the topic of "Aalam Sabh Abaad Kareen" in order to raise public awareness about global warming and climate change. The Festival will be included sessions, music, arts, and other festivities.

References

External links
 Official Website
 Sindh Literature Festival Journey Of Sindhi Language
 Activism through discourse Zafar Ahmed Khan, The News International March 27, 2022

Sindhi culture
Sindhi festivals
 Events in Sindh
 Festivals in Sindh
 Literary festivals in Pakistan